The Gipsdalen Group is a geologic group in Norway. It preserves fossils dating back to the Permian period.

See also

 List of fossiliferous stratigraphic units in Norway

References
 

Geologic groups of Europe
Geologic formations of Norway
Permian Norway